"Glamour Boy" is a song written by Burton Cummings and performed by The Guess Who, and was featured on their 1973 album, #10. The song was produced by Jack Richardson.

It was inspired by David Bowie and reached #14 in Canada in 1973.  The song was also released in the United States as a single, peaking at #83 on the Cash Box Top 100.

Background
Burton Cummings on "Glamour Boy" in 2016.
One of my all time favourites. It was originally inspired by David Bowie, and now that he's gone I can kinda do it as a tribute to his amazing career. I was very threatened ... I felt very threatened when David Bowie came along, because it all changed. Music took second or third place to the appearance, and then theatrics came into Rock n Roll...

Popular culture
"Glamour Boy" was featured prominently in the 1998 Don McKellar film  Last Night.

References

1973 songs
1973 singles
Songs written by Burton Cummings
The Guess Who songs
Song recordings produced by Jack Richardson (record producer)
RCA Victor singles